The 1992–93 Sunshine Hockey League season was the second season of the Sunshine Hockey League, a North American minor pro league. Four teams participated in the league, and the West Palm Beach Blaze won the Sunshine Cup for the second consecutive year.

Regular season

Sunshine Cup-Playoffs

External links
 Season 1993/94 on hockeydb.com

Sunshine Hockey League seasons
Sun